is a railway station in the city of Nikkō, Tochigi, Japan, operated by the third-sector railway company Watarase Keikoku Railway.

Lines

Station layout
The station consists of a single side platform serving traffic in both directions. The station is unattended.

Adjacent stations

History
Haramukō Station opened on 31 December 1912 as a station on the Ashio Railway.

Surrounding area

See also
 List of railway stations in Japan

External links

 Station information (Watarase Keikoku) 

Railway stations in Tochigi Prefecture
Railway stations in Japan opened in 1912
Nikkō, Tochigi